Ring Pop is a brand of fruit flavored lollipops manufactured by the Bazooka Companies. They are in the form of a wearable plastic ring with a large hard candy "jewel" and come in an assortment of flavors and colors.

History 
Ring Pops were invented in 1979 by a man named Frank Richards who was a product engineer at the Topps Company. He wanted to help his daughter in breaking her unsavoury thumb-sucking habit, so he invented the Ring Pop as a treat to eliminate her childish addiction. This treat is similar to a baby pacifier, where the jewel is made out of a hard candy, and is attached to a plastic disc that clamps around a finger. It was thought to be a brilliant idea and solution to get kids to stop their unwanted thumb-sucking habit, while enjoying a sugary and sweet piece of candy instead of sucking on their bland and most likely unclean thumb. While the Ring Pop was not the first piece of candy jewelry, it did follow in the footsteps of other jewelry themed candies, such as the candy necklace and candy bracelet, both of which were released in 1958, almost two decades before the invention of the Ring Pop.

Media 
The debut of Ring Pops on television was in the early 1980s, catching many children's attention with its memorable theme song and the famous phrase, "It's a lollipop, without a stick! A ring of flavor you can lick!" The commercial entails many children eating and having fun with Ring Pops, however there is a scene with two children, a boy and a girl, where the little boy is supposedly proposing to the little girl with the Ring Pop. This scene has become a signature staple over the years as one of the most memorable scenes in Ring Pop commercial history.

Variations

The candy originally was available in two flavors, Cherry and Grape. Over time, Ring Pop flavors have expanded into an array of flavors, such as Blue Raspberry, Strawberry, Watermelon, Lime, and Apple. Ring Pop Sours came into the mix in the 1980s in flavors such as, Sour Green Apple, Sour Cherry Berry, Sour Watermelon, Sour Lemonade, Sour Cherry, and Sour Raspberry Lemonade. Topps has also released Ring Pop "twisted" multi-flavored lollipops, which come in flavors such as, Berry Blast and Citrus Craze, as well as creamy varieties, such as Strawberry Ice Cream. Most recently, in 2013, Topps has come out with Ring Pop Gummies as an alternative to the original hard candy. Special Ring Pops are made for some holidays. Easter Ring Pops use the traditional plastic ring but replace the gem-shaped hard candy with chicks or bunnies.

In 2011, Bazooka issued Ring Pops encrusted with Swarovski Crystal and colored with Maverick Blue to the Dallas Mavericks for their winning of the 2011 NBA Finals.

Topps launched Ring Pop Gummies in 2013, a wearable and edible gummy version of the candy.

Dietary 
Bazooka Candy Brands, a division of Topps Inc., claims Ring Pops to be one of their best selling candies among Orthodox Jews because it is one of the few candies that are kosher.

See also
 List of confectionery brands
 Whistle Pops

References

External links
 

Brand name confectionery
Lollipops
Products introduced in 1979
Rings (jewellery)
Topps confectionery products